Nikolai Melnitsky (26 April 1887 (OS)/9 May 1887(NS), Kyiv, Russian Empire – 7 November 1965) was a sport shooter who competed for the Russian Empire in the 1912 Summer Olympics.

Born in Kyiv, May 9, 1887. He was part of the Russian 30 metre military pistol team, which won the silver medal. As part of the 50 metre military pistol team he finished fourth. He also competed in the 30 metre rapid fire pistol event finishing 22nd and in the 50 metre pistol finishing 33rd.

References

External links
Nikolai Melnitsky's profile at databaseOlympics

1887 births
1965 deaths
Male sport shooters from the Russian Empire
ISSF pistol shooters
Shooters at the 1912 Summer Olympics
Olympic competitors for the Russian Empire
Sportspeople from Kyiv
Olympic medalists in shooting
Medalists at the 1912 Summer Olympics
Soviet emigrants to France